Aneugmenus is a genus of sawfly (order Hymenoptera, family Tenthredinidae).

Species
Aneugmenus bibolinii Zombori, 1979 
Aneugmenus coronatus (Klug, 1814) 
Aneugmenus fuerstenbergensis (Konow, 1885) 
Aneugmenus oertzeni (Konow, 1887) 
Aneugmenus padi (Linnaeus, 1761) 
Aneugmenus temporalis (Thomson, 1871

References

Tenthredinidae